The Uniforms Act of 1894 is an Act of Parliament to regulate and restrict the wearing of Naval and Military uniforms in the United Kingdom.

The Act
The Act makes it an offence for military uniforms to be worn without authority:

The Act does not include the wearing of honours, medals and decorations.

Definition of Naval and Military Forces
The restrictions concern all:
Royal Navy uniforms - 'naval' uniforms.
British Army uniforms - 'military' uniforms.
Royal Air Force uniforms - later included in the 'military' definition.

As members of the Cadet Forces also wear military uniform (although are generally civilians), it would seem that the Act would also prohibit unauthorised use of Cadet Forces uniforms.

The Act also says that '"Her Majesty’s Military Forces” has the same meaning as in the Armed Forces Act 2006;
[but] “Her Majesty's Naval Forces” does not include any Commonwealth force"'.

Consequences
The Act makes any unauthorised use of said naval or military uniforms publishable by:

Arrests, Charges and Convictions
In 2012, the Ministry of Defence Police arrested one person, in Devon, for wearing a Royal Navy uniform.

In 2016, the Metropolitan Police made an arrest for one person "wearing military insignia without authority".

In 2017, one man in Derbyshire was fined £500, after pleading guilty to Section 2 of the Act and wearing a uniform that he was not authorised to wear.

The Crown Prosecution Service reported that between 2012–13 and 2017, that seven people in England and Wales appeared before magistrates, charged with breaching the Act.

References

United Kingdom Acts of Parliament 1894